Aila Annikki Paloniemi (born 28 January 1956 in Kyyjärvi, Finland) is a Finnish politician, representing the Centre Party in the Parliament of Finland since 2003. She was first elected to the Parliament from the Central Finland constituency in the 2003 elections with 4,887 votes.

References

External links
 Home page of Aila Paloniemi

1956 births
Living people
Centre Party (Finland) politicians
Members of the Parliament of Finland (2003–07)
Members of the Parliament of Finland (2007–11)
Members of the Parliament of Finland (2011–15)
Members of the Parliament of Finland (2015–19)
People from Kyyjärvi
Women members of the Parliament of Finland
21st-century Finnish women politicians